Tony R. Rodriguez is an American novelist residing in the Bay Area of California.  He is the former Board Chairman of the literary collective PEN Oakland, a chapter of Pen America Center, which is an affiliate of PEN International.  His novels have been published in Scotland and the United States of America.  They include the best-selling titles Under These Stars (Beatdom Books, 2014) and When I Followed the Elephant (Cauliay Publishing and Distribution, 2011). His books have been studied at various high schools and universities, including the University of Texas Rio Grande Valley, formerly known as the University of Texas-Pan American. Rodriguez has also been published in various anthologies and literary journals.  His works have been widely reviewed, especially through the East Bay Review, View From Here magazine, as well as local Bay Area press. Rodriguez has been featured in many Bay Area literary festivals, including LitQuake, the Oakland Book Festival and 100,000 Poets for Change.

Bibliography
Novels
 Under These Stars (Beatdom Books, 2014)
 When I Followed the Elephant (Cauliay Publishing and Distribution, 2011)

Anthologies
 Fightin’ Words (Heyday Books, 2015)
 Beatitude Golden Anniversary: 1959-2009

References

Living people
21st-century American novelists
American male novelists
21st-century American male writers
Year of birth missing (living people)